Issy Wood (born 1993) is an American artist known for her paintings and pop music who lives and works in London, England.

Music 
Wood released an EP, Cries Real Tears!, in 2020 with Zelig Records. She released a second EP, If It’s Any Constellation, on April 13, 2021. In 2022, Wood released My Body Your Choice.

Collections
Wood's work is included in the collections of the Institute of Contemporary Art, Miami, the 
Rhode Island School of Design Museum, Providence, the Sifang Art Museum, Nanjing, and the Zabludowicz Collection, London.

Exhibits 

 2022 - Issy Wood: Time Sensitive -  Michael Werner Gallery, New York

References

Living people
1993 births
21st-century American women artists
American women painters